The Canadian National Seismograph Network is a network of seismographs to detect earthquakes across Canada. It is operated by the Geological Survey of Canada and consists of over 60 low-gain seismographs and over 100 high-gain seismographs. It was started in 1975.

References

Sources

Seismology of Canada
Seismological observatories, organisations and projects